Voskop is a village and a former municipality in the Korçë County, southeastern Albania. At the 2015 local government reform it became a subdivision of the municipality Korçë. The population at the 2011 census was 3,832. The municipal unit consists of the villages Voskop, Dërsnik, Polenë, Vinçan, Goskovë lart, Goskovë poshtë and Damjanec. Voskop is approximately 8 km from Korçë.

Notable people
Alemdar Mustafa Pasha originated from here.

References

Former municipalities in Korçë County
Administrative units of Korçë
Villages in Korçë County